Valencia International Piano Competition Prize Iturbi XVI took take place in Valencia from September 15–27, 2008. It was won by Zhengyu Chen, who became the first Chinese pianist to attain the 1st prize.

Jury
  Joaquín Soriano (president)
  Antonio di Cristofano
    Bella Davidovich
  Petras Geniusas
  Peter Lang
   Stanislav Pochekin
  Fernando Puchol
  Jesús Ángel Rodríguez
  Maria Tipo
  Fujiko Yamada

Prizes

 Awarded to the best qualified Valencian competitor. 
 Awarded to the best qualified Spanish competitor.
 Awarded to the best Spanish contemporary music performer.
 Awarded to the best Concerto performer. 
 Awarded to the best Spanish music performer.

Compositions commissioned for the competition
 Emilio Calandín - Tres naipes del I Ching
 Miguel Gálvez-Taroncher - Chronos / Kayros
 Enrique Sanz-Burguete - A Matilde

Competition Results (by rounds)

First round
September 16 and 17. Palau de la Música - Sala Rodrigo.
 Domenico Scarlatti / Antonio Soler Sonata + Two pieces among Frédéric Chopin's Nocturnes, Impromptus, Mazurkas and Waltzes + Gabriel Fauré / Claude Debussy / Maurice Ravel composition + Ad libitum.
   Ron Abramski
  Mario Alonso Herrero
  Angelo Arciglione
  Honoré Béjin Garcia
  Enrique Bernaldo de Quirós Martín
  Tatyana Bezmenova
  Ingfrid Breie Nyhus
 Northern Ireland Cathal Breslin
  Ángel Cabrera
  Christian Chamorel
  Zhengyu Chen
  Wu Chi
  Sebastian Di Bin
  Nazareno Ferrugio
  Martina Filjak
  Sofya Gulyak
  Shinnosuke Inugai
  Soyeon Kim
  Karalina Kirylchyk
  Yun Jung Koo
   Martin Labazevitch
  Daiva Lavrinavičiūtė
  Aleksey Lebedev
  Li-Wei Lee
  Yu Mi Lee
  José Menor Martín
  Theodosia Ntokou
  Vincenzo Oliva
  Fumie Onda
  Jin Woo Park
  Joo Hyeon Park
  Tristan Pfaff
    Marianna Prjevalskaya
  Ivana Ristova
  Daniil Sayamov
  Sergey Sobolev
  Masataka Takada
  Yoshida Tomoaki
  Maria Tretiyakova
  Andrey Yaroshinsky

Quarter-finals
September 18, 19 and 20. Palau de la Música - Sala Rodrigo.
 Joseph Haydn / Wolfgang Amadeus Mozart / Ludwig van Beethoven Sonata or Variations + Frédéric Chopin Etude + Isaac Albéniz (Iberia) / Enrique Granados (Goyescas) / Manuel de Falla (Fantasía Bética, Cuatro piezas españolas) composition
   Ron Abramski
  Angelo Arciglione
  Tatyana Bezmenova
  Ángel Cabrera
  Christian Chamorel
  Zhengyu Chen
  Sebastian Di Bin
  Nazareno Ferrugio
  Shinnosuke Inugai
  Soyeon Kim
  Yun Jung Koo
   Martin Labazevitch
  Aleksey Lebedev
  Yu-Mi Lee
  Fumie Onda
  Tristan Pfaff
    Marianna Prjevalskaya
  Maria Tretiyakova

Semi-finals
September 21 and 22. Palau de la Música - Sala Rodrigo.
 Romantic composition/s + Mandatory contemporary composition.
   Ron Abramsky
  Angelo Arciglione
  Ángel Cabrera
  Christian Chamorel
  Zhengyu Chen
  Shinnosuke Inugai
  Soyeon Kim
  Yun Jung Koo
   Martin Labazevitch
  Yu-Mi Lee
  Tristan Pfaff (withdrawal)
    Marianna Prjevalskaya

Final
September 26 and 27. Palau de la Música - Sala Iturbi.
  Angelo Arciglione --- Frédéric Chopin: 2nd.
  Ángel Cabrera --- Frédéric Chopin: 2nd.
  Zhengyu Chen --- Ferenc Liszt: 1st.
  Soyeon Kim --- Piotr Ilyich Tchaikovsky: 1st.
  Yu-Mi Lee --- Piotr Ilyich Tchaikovsky: 1st.
    Marianna Prjevalskaya --- Frédéric Chopin: 1st.
Orquesta de Valencia. Max Bragado, conductor.

External links
 Diputación de Valencia - Valencia International Piano Competition José Iturbi

José Iturbi International Piano Competition
September 2008 events in Europe
2008 in Spanish music
History of Valencia